Michael Lee is a fictional character on the HBO drama The Wire, played by Tristan Wilds. He is a middle school pupil and a friend of Namond Brice, Randy Wagstaff, and Duquan "Dukie" Weems. More soft-spoken and composed than his friends, Michael takes on a leadership role among his peers. Michael is very protective of his younger half-brother Bug, to whom he is effectively a parent, and Dukie, who is often ridiculed by his peers for his poverty and poor hygiene. 

Michael's mother Raylene is a drug addict, and he avoids discussing his home life because of his precarious family situation. It is strongly implied that he was sexually abused by Bug's father Devar, who is returning from prison. As he grows older, Michael pushes away many of his peers and acquaintances, including his boxing coach Cutty, and eventually his friends Randy and Dukie. He becomes a protégé of Marlo Stanfield's enforcer Chris Partlow, an unemotional killer who may also have been abused as a child. In his last scene, he is shown robbing drug dealers, implying he is set to take the place of Omar.

Biography

Season 4
Michael is interested in boxing and often works out at Dennis "Cutty" Wise's local gym. Michael distrusts male authority figures; he rebuffs both Cutty's offer to train him in boxing and Marlo Stanfield's offer of a cash handout with no strings attached. Michael tells his friends that he is reluctant to feel like he owes anyone.

Regardless, Marlo is impressed with Michael's strength of character in denying a handout and not budging, even after Stanfield personally confronts and insults him. In order to provide new school supplies for himself and his brother, Michael temporarily takes over Namond's job as a runner for drug dealer Bodie Broadus. Bodie takes a strong interest in Michael and offers to employ him permanently, but Michael turns him down.

Marlo sends Chris Partlow to find out more about Michael, so Chris offers Michael cash and protection to join Marlo's organization. Michael turns down the offer, claiming that he must look out for his family first. Michael also turns down Randy's offer of paid work delivering fliers on Election Day. He also refuses to work with Namond selling drugs.

Michael gets into trouble with his math teacher Roland "Prez" Pryzbylewski, because he will not do his homework nor participate in classroom exercises. Prez gives him detention, which Michael skips in order to pick up Bug from elementary school. Prez learns from Randy why Michael skipped detention and approaches Michael directly with an appeal to discuss any problems he might have. Michael does not confide in Mr. Prez but begins to work harder in the class and is a quick study when Prez uses games of cards and dice to teach probability. Michael also completes his homework.

Cutty continues to encourage Michael to take an interest in boxing, but Michael continues to be wary of him. He takes Michael and Justin to a professional fight but Michael refuses to let Cutty drive him home after Justin is dropped off. He is suspicious of Cutty's motives and implies it's because Cutty tends to get involved with the mothers of boys who use the gym, then he drops them. Cutty continues to try to break down Michael's defenses, but Michael remains suspicious of him and later hints to his friends that Cutty might be a pederast, an untrue suspicion seemingly based on his friendliness with Michael.

When Namond is attacked by rival drug dealers, Michael is there to support his friend. However, when Cutty asks Michael what Namond is getting into, Michael tells him it is none of their business. Later, at Cutty's gym, Michael beats Namond for teasing Dukie and runs out when Cutty breaks up the fight. Cutty tells Michael no one wants him there, but later feels guilty about it.

Over the course of season 4, Michael evolves from a soft-spoken introvert into a cold-blooded killer. The key event is when his step-father Devar is paroled and returns to their home, and Michael becomes desperate to get rid of him. It becomes more and more clear that Bug's father sexually abused Michael before going to prison, and Raylene did nothing to protect him. 

This is hinted by Michael's distrust in adult males, the negative attitude he displays when subjects involving sexuality are brought up, and his interactions with his mother. It is confirmed later in "Took" (season 5, episode 7), when Bunk comes across Devar's prison record and says, "Look at you, you baby-bumping motherfucker"; and later, while grilling Michael, he says, "Look at you...not even blinking.  Not that I blame you, after what this heinous motherfucker did to you."

Michael asks Randy what would happen if he were to call social services on his stepfather, and Randy, speaking from experience, says that Michael and Bug would be split up and would both be placed in group homes. Out of options, Michael turns to Marlo and Chris for help. Chris nabs Devar, taking him to one of his usual body dumps and questioning him about his sexual interest in young boys. Instead of his usual cold efficiency, Chris is consumed with rage, pistol whipping and kicking Devar to death.

Now in debt to Marlo's protection, Michael becomes a soldier in his drug operation, and Marlo provides Michael and Bug with their own apartment. Marlo refers to Michael as Chris' "pup" when Michael is not around. When Michael moves into his new apartment, he offers Dukie a place to live, although with the apparent price of enlisting Dukie into Marlo's crew.

When Cutty decides to apologize and catches up with Michael on a street corner with Marlo's crew, Michael initially rebuffs him, and Monk shoots Cutty twice in the leg for interfering. Finally understanding that Cutty is on his side, Michael stops Monk from delivering a final headshot, then offers to wait with Cutty until the ambulance comes. Cutty, to protect Michael, tells him to go with "his people".

Season 5
More than a year later, Michael continues to work with the Stanfield Organization and still reports to Chris Partlow. His crew has changed somewhat, and while Duquan "Dukie" Weems and Kenard remain, Spider and a young dealer named Marcus now work for him. The other dealers do not respect the weak Dukie and neglect his requests for status updates. Michael decides to withdraw Dukie from the corner and pay him to look after Bug instead, promoting Spider in his place.

Chris and Snoop continue to train Michael as an enforcer. Michael is brought along to kill Junebug after Marlo Stanfield hears that Junebug has been disparaging Marlo's sexuality.  They show Michael the importance of preparation, arriving over an hour before the hit to scope out the scene and make sure there are no surprises. When Michael questions the necessity of the murder, since Junebug has not been confirmed as the origin of the rumors, Snoop angrily retorts that hearsay matters more than facts in protecting Marlo's reputation.

Partlow orders Michael to watch the back of the house and kill anyone who tries to escape, while Partlow and Snoop enter from the front. Once inside, the older enforcers kill three adults, but a small child runs out of back to Michael, who cannot bring himself to shoot the boy.

Following his involvement in the Junebug murders, Michael becomes socially withdrawn. Duquan, Michael, and Bug take a day trip to Six Flags. They enjoy their day, but when they return Monk confronts Michael about leaving his corner unattended.

Michael and his crew are arrested by Officer Anthony Colicchio, but no charges are filed. Raylene signs Michael out of jail and chastises him for not bringing Bug to see her more often. She wheedles Michael for money, saying she deserves it for signing him out of jail, but he refuses to pay her to do what any mother should.

Bunk Moreland questions Michael about his stepfather's murder, saying he doesn't blame Michael for having him killed because of the sexual abuse he suffered, but knows that Michael lacked the size and strength to commit a brutal murder like that himself and asks who killed Devar.  Michael refuses to tell Bunk anything.

Along with Chris, Snoop, and O-Dog, Michael participates in the devious counter-ambush of Omar Little in Monk's apartment, from which Omar barely escapes, using "freaky Spiderman shit". Later, Omar gets the drop on Michael and tells him to send a message to Stanfield, and Michael is afraid Omar might recognize him from the shootout. 

With Omar in the streets terrorizing Marlo's corners, Michael questions why Chris and Snoop don't inform Marlo that Omar is casting aspersions on Marlo's reputation, so Marlo can take action. This and his questioning of other orders displeases Chris and causes a perceptible rift between Michael and Snoop.

When Marlo, Chris, Cheese, and Monk are all arrested in the culmination of the Stanfield investigation, Monk suspects Michael of turning informant. Although neither Marlo nor Chris believes Michael is a snitch, Marlo will not "stake his future on" that belief, and reluctantly orders Snoop, who is still at liberty, to kill Michael.

Snoop tells Michael that with everyone locked up, she needs him for some "serious business" and tells him there is no need to bring his gun, because she has a "clean one" for him. Michael follows Partlow's advice to check out the scene early, and catches Snoop talking to the target. In Snoop's SUV en route to the supposed hit, Michael pulls out his gun and kills her.

Michael now has a vehicle for the night, and he, Dukie, and Bug hurriedly pack and drive to Michael's aunt's house in Howard County. Michael walks Bug to the door with a shoebox full of cash for Aunt Carla.

Back in Baltimore, Michael tells Dukie that it would be too dangerous for them to stay together. At Dukie's' request, Michael drives him to the squalid stables where the arabber (junk man) lives among homeless people and junkies. Dukie tries to make light of the situation, but Michael is too depressed, and they part. Dukie hesitates when he sees the junk man injecting heroin and turns back to Michael, but he has already left.

Michael goes into hiding, then returns as a stickup man robbing drug dealers, replacing Omar Little. He robs Vinson in his rim shop, getting him to surrender his drug money by shooting him in the knee with a shotgun.

Further reading
Wired for Destruction?: Understanding the Implications of Michael Lee's Degeneration, American Individualism, and the Institution of the Hood in HBO's The Wire, by Cladue Atcho
"The Wire: Urban Decay and American Television," edited by Tiffany Potter, C.W. Marshall
"Tapping into The Wire: The Real Urban Crisis," by Peter L. Beilenson, Patrick A. McGuire
"The Wire and America's Dark Corners: Critical Essays," edited by Arin Keeble, Ivan Stacy

References

The Wire characters
Fictional African-American people
Henchmen of The Wire
Fictional career criminals
Fictional gang members
Fictional gangsters
Fictional murderers
Fictional outlaws
Television characters introduced in 2006
Drug dealers of The Wire
Child characters in television
Male characters in television
Fictional victims of child sexual abuse